Pocono Peak Lake is a lake in Lehigh Township, Wayne County, Pennsylvania in the United States. The lake is the origin of the Lehigh River.

See also
List of lakes in Pennsylvania

References 

Bodies of water of Wayne County, Pennsylvania
Lakes of Pennsylvania
Lehigh River
Pocono Mountains